The 2016–17 Kansas Jayhawks women's basketball team represented the University of Kansas in the 2016–17 NCAA Division I women's basketball season. The Jayhawks are led by second year head coach Brandon Schneider. They played their home games at Allen Fieldhouse in Lawrence, Kansas and were members of the Big 12 Conference. They finished the season 8–22, 2–16 in Big 12 play to finish in last place. They lost in the first round of the Big 12 women's tournament to Oklahoma State.

Roster

Schedule and results 

|-
!colspan=12 style=""| Exhibition

|-
!colspan=12 style=""| Non-conference regular season

|-
!colspan=12 style=""| Big 12 regular season

|-
!colspan=12 style=""| Big 12 Women's Tournament

x- All JTV games will air on Metro Sports, ESPN3 and local affiliates.

See also 
 2016–17 Kansas Jayhawks men's basketball team

References 

Kansas Jayhawks women's basketball seasons
Kansas
Kansas Jayhawks women's basketball
Kansas Jayhawks women's basketball